Huberto Aldaz Hernández (born 3 November 1957) is a Mexican politician affiliated with the National Action Party. As of 2014 he served as Deputy of the LIX Legislature of the Mexican Congress as a plurinominal representative.

References

1957 births
Living people
Politicians from Oaxaca
Members of the Chamber of Deputies (Mexico)
National Action Party (Mexico) politicians
Chapingo Autonomous University alumni
21st-century Mexican politicians
Deputies of the LIX Legislature of Mexico